is a junction railway station located in Chūō-ku, Chiba, Chiba Prefecture, Japan, operated by the East Japan Railway Company (JR East). It is also  freight depot for the Japan Freight Railway Company (JR Freight) and the all-freight Keiyō Rinkai Railway Company.

Lines
The station is also the starting point of the Keiyō Rinkai Railway's Rinkai Main Line.

Station layout
Soga is an elevated station with an elevated station building, three island platforms and a total of six passenger lines. Freight lines are located to the side of the first platform, and the Keiyō Rinkai Railway office is located to the side of these. The station is staffed with personnel from both companies. It includes a Midori no Madoguchi staffed ticket office and automatic ticket gates.

Platforms

Lines 3 and 4 terminate at this station.
During the morning rush hour and certain other times, two different trains bound for Tokyo, namely the train connecting to the Sōbu Line Rapid via the Sotobō Line, and the Keiyō Line trains (via Kaihimmakuhari and Shin-Kiba) leave from the same platform (platform 2).

History
Soga Station opened on 20 January 1896. The station became part of JR East on the division and privatization of JNR on 1 April 1987. The Keiyō Line opened on 1 December 1988.

Passenger statistics
In fiscal 2019, the station was used by an average of 34,189 passengers daily (boarding passengers only).

Surroundings
Chibadera Station
Soga Sports Park
Fukuda Denshi Arena (Soga Stadium) --JEF United Ichihara / Chiba Home Stadium.
JFE Gymnasium
Shukutoku University (Chiba Campus, Chiba 2nd Campus)
Ueno Law Business College

Bus routes
 Chiba Chuo Bus
 Kominato Tetsudō Bus
 Askabus
 Keikyu Bus (Haneda Airport Limousine Bus (same direction as the Kominato Tetsudo Bus))

See also
 List of railway stations in Japan

References

External links

 JR East Station information 

Railway stations in Chiba Prefecture
Railway stations in Japan opened in 1896
Uchibō Line
Sotobō Line
Keiyō Line
Stations of East Japan Railway Company
Stations of Japan Freight Railway Company
Railway stations in Chiba (city)